"My Block" is a 2002 song by American rapper Scarface, and was the lead single released from his seventh album, The Fix.

The song samples the piano intro from the 1971 Roberta Flack and Donny Hathaway song "Be Real Black For Me".

"My Block" made it to 46 on the Billboard Hot R&B/Hip-Hop Songs.

The song was later interpolated by YBN Cordae and Chance the Rapper on the track, "Bad Idea", on the album, The Lost Boy.

Track listing

A-Side
"My Block" (Radio Edit)   
"My Block" (Album Version)   
"My Block" (Instrumental)

B-Side
"Guess Who's Back" (Radio Edit)
"Guess Who's Back" (Album Version)
"Guess Who's Back" (Instrumental)

Charts

References

2002 singles
2002 songs
Scarface (rapper) songs
Gangsta rap songs
Music videos directed by Marc Klasfeld